Soekmono (14 July 1922 – 9 July 1997) was an Indonesian archaeologist and historian.

Throughout his career, he wrote about and researched Borobudur and the Javanese Candi. His main publication about Javanese Candi was a doctoral thesis presented in 1974.

He was the director of the National Archaeological Institute of the Republic Indonesia (Lembaga Purbakala dan Peninggalan Nasional Republic Indonesia). He was also the Project Manager of the Borobudur Restoration Project in the 1970s - the Proyek Pemugaran Candi Borobudur - when Borobudur was pulled down and rebuilt as part of a UNESCO project to rebuild the monument.

Publications
 New light on some Borobudur problems (1969)
 Ancient Indonesian art of the central and eastern Javanese periods (1971)
 Pengantar sejarah kebudayaan Indonesia, Volume 1 (1973)
 Pengantar sejarah kebudayaan Indonesia, Volume 2 (1973)
 Pengantar sejarah kebudayaan Indonesia, Volume 3 (1973)
 Chandi Borobudur: a monument of mankind (1976)
 Chandi Gumpung of Muara Jambi: a platform in stead [sic] of a conventional chandi (1987)
 Rekonstruksi sejarah Malayu kuno sesuai tuntutan arkeologi (1992)
 The Javanese Candi: function and meaning (1995)

Notes

Indonesian archaeologists
1922 births
1997 deaths
20th-century Indonesian historians
20th-century archaeologists